Javier Antonio Cabello Rubio (born 20 July 1974) is a Spanish football manager, currently an assistant for FC Dallas.

Career
Born in Valencia, Cabello started his career with Villarreal CF in 1999, working in their youth setup as a coordinator. He was subsequently appointed manager of CD Cieza in the following year, and remained in charge for four seasons.

In 2004 Cabello returned to Villarreal, again working in the youth categories; in 2006, he started working as a scout for the first team. In 2008, he was named director of Valencia CF's youth setup.

On 18 July 2010, Cabello returned to managerial duties, being again appointed at the helm of Cieza. In August of the following year, he was named manager of CD Castellón.

Cabello left Castellón in January 2012, following the departure of owner Fernando Miralles. He remained without a club until June 2014, as he was appointed Cultural y Deportiva Leonesa manager.

On 4 July 2015, Cabello was named general manager at Elche CF, but left his post nearly a month later. In June 2017, he was one of the four assistant managers who joined Luis Zubeldía's staff at Deportivo Alavés.

On 17 September 2017, after Zubeldía's dismissal, Cabello was named interim of the Basque side. His first professional match occurred three days later, a 0–1 away loss against Deportivo de La Coruña.

In December 2021, Cabello moved to the United States and joined FC Dallas of Major League Soccer as an assistant to Nico Estévez.

Managerial statistics

References

External links

1974 births
Living people
Sportspeople from Valencia
Spanish football managers
La Liga managers
Segunda División B managers
CD Castellón managers
Cultural Leonesa managers
Deportivo Alavés managers
CD Cieza managers
FC Dallas non-playing staff